Piastra may refer to:
Historical currencies used in some parts of what became Italy before unification in the 19th century:
 Neapolitan piastra 
 Sicilian piastra
 Two Sicilies piastra
Historical currency of Gran Colombia

See also

piastre